Dawson Independent School District may refer to:

 Dawson Independent School District (Dawson County, Texas)
 Dawson Independent School District (Navarro County, Texas)